Sanjaya Kumar Mishra (born 29 December 1961) is an Indian Judge. Presently, he is Chief Justice of Jharkhand High Court. He was a Judge of Uttarakhand High Court. He has previously served as Acting Chief Justice of Uttarakhand High Court and Judge of Orissa High Court.

References

 

Indian judges
1961 births
Living people